Peoples Trust for Endangered Species (PTES) is a charitable organisation registered in England and Wales. It exists to promote the conservation of rare or declining species and habitats in the UK and worldwide through monitoring, public engagement, education, and through the funding of conservation projects and research. It also owns and manages two nature reserves. As of April 2015, PTES has 16 employees, five trustees and coordinates around 24,000 volunteers in the UK. PTES relies on donations from the general public and grants from trusts and foundations to continue its work - it receives no core funding from the UK Government. The organisation has registered charity number 274206.

History
PTES was founded in 1977. Originally based in South Kensington at Imperial College London, in 1993 the organisation moved to its present location in Battersea, south-west London. In 2001 PTES developed Mammals Trust UK, a restricted fund and campaign targeting the conservation of British mammals. In 2006, Mammals Trust UK was incorporated under the activities of PTES. PTES still operates a ring-fenced funding stream for British mammals but the names ‘Mammals Trust UK’ and 'Mammals Trust' have since been disbanded.

Activities
PTES exists to support and restore our natural heritage – the diverse assemblages of species and their habitats present on Earth – through practical conservation and by educating and informing people about its importance. The charity supports conservation projects and research both in the UK and abroad through three funding schemes: ‘worldwide grants’, ‘UK mammals grants’ and ‘internship awards’. The charities' work in the UK has a focus on mammals, with hazel dormouse, European hedgehog and European water vole current target species. Saproxylic beetles are also a target group, and traditional orchards a target habitat. Assistance from volunteers and collaboration with other environmental organisations are both integral to this work.

Wildlife Surveys 
PTES runs several national, public-participation surveys aimed at monitoring wild populations and habitats. This includes the two mammal surveys that now have been running for over a decade: Living with Mammals (2003) and Mammals on Roads (2001). It was a founding member of the Tracking Mammals Partnership.

As of 2013, extant surveys are: 
 Living with Mammals (2003–present): an annual survey running through April, May and June, recording sightings and/or field signs of mammals at sites within the built environment. These are mainly urban or suburban green spaces such as gardens, allotments, cemeteries and recreational ground.
 Mammals on Roads (2001–present): an annual survey collecting records of mammal road casualties ('roadkill') on journeys along single carriageways. Changes in counts (over a given distance) from year to year are used to estimate changes in the wider population.
 The Traditional Orchard Survey of England and Wales: (2006 – present): orchards and fruit trees provide a highly biodiverse habitat and are listed as a Priority Habitat under the UK Biodiversity Action Plan (BAP). PTES is creating a UK inventory and map of the habitat.
 The Hedgehog Hibernation Survey (2012–2014): runs between 1 February and 31 August, collecting sightings of dead and alive hedgehogs through the Hedgehog Street website.

Mammal Monitoring

Hazel dormouse
PTES maintains the National Dormouse Monitoring Programme (NDMP). This is based on around 400 woodland sites where at least fifty dormouse nest boxes have been put up, per site, that are inspected by licensed volunteers at monthly intervals between May and October. In 2014, PTES collated 6,827 hazel dormice records from 387 sites.

The NDMP has been running for the past 25 years and is run in partnership with Royal Holloway University, Natural England and several hundred trained volunteer monitors.

European water vole

In 2015 PTES launched a new project to try and coordinate conservation efforts for the water vole - an animal that has declined by over 90% in Britain since the 1980s. The National Water Vole Monitoring Programme is the first ongoing monitoring scheme for this species in the UK and aims to bring together data from several hundred sites to allow the status of the species to be assessed year-on-year.

Campaigns

European hedgehog

In 2011 PTES, in partnership with the British Hedgehog Preservation Society (BHPS), launched a national campaign to conserve the hedgehog, a mammal that has declined in Britain by at least 25% since the year 2001.[10] The Hedgehog Street campaign has inspired thousands of people to make their gardens hedgehog-friendly and engage with their neighbours to make their entire streets accessible to hedgehogs, who desperately need our gardens to survive. [11]

As part of the joint campaign, PTES coordinates the European Hedgehog Research Group and convenes a steering group for the species, based on the previous BAP group, that includes the British Hedgehog Preservation Society, pre-eminent mammal ecologist Dr Pat Morris, and hedgehog enthusiast and author Hugh Warwick. In 2015 they produced the first conservation strategy for the species in the UK. The only UK training course on hedgehog-friendly land management, surveying and mitigation for professionals has also been developed and is being delivered around the UK.

PTES also supports research into the causes of hedgehog decline. Some of this is jointly funded with BHPS.

Saving Cats and Dogs

In 2013 the campaign "Saving Big Cats and Wild Dogs" (shortened to "Saving Cats and Dogs") was launched. This is based around a website that provides information about the conservation projects that focus on wild felids and canids that are all supported through PTES grant funding. With a donation you can twin your pet cat or dog with a wild counterpart.

Reserves

Briddlesford 
PTES own and manage 158 hectares of land on the Isle of Wight, including a majority of the Briddlesford Copses Site of Special Scientific Interest (SSSI) and Special Area of Conservation (SAC) together with about 50 hectares of farmland. The Briddlesford Copses represent the largest remaining block of ancient semi-natural woodland on the Isle of Wight. Notable species present include Hazel dormouse, Bechstein’s bat, barbastelle bat, red squirrel, narrow-leaved lungwort and the fungus weevil Pseudeuparius sepicola.

Rough Hill
Rough Hill is a traditionally managed orchard of ~4 hectares, located on a bank of the river Avon on the outskirts of Pershore, Worcestershire. Since being acquired by the Trust in 2003, the orchard is being sensitively restored for the benefit of its biodiversity and heritage value. The principal management activities are the provision and care of new fruit trees, restoration pruning of extant mature trees, and the use of extensive livestock grazing to manage the species-rich calcareous grassland communities present.

Associate organisations
PTES is a member of the IUCN and Wildlife and Countryside Link.

References

Animal charities based in the United Kingdom
Biology organisations based in the United Kingdom
Charities based in London
Nature conservation organisations based in the United Kingdom
Endangered species
Environmental organisations based in England